Li Peijing (born 22 May 1989 in Shaanxi) is a Chinese rifle shooter. She competed in the 50 m rifle 3 positions event at the 2012 Summer Olympics, where she placed 9th.

References

1989 births
Living people
Chinese female sport shooters
Olympic shooters of China
Shooters at the 2012 Summer Olympics
Sport shooters from Shaanxi
Universiade medalists in shooting
Universiade gold medalists for China
Medalists at the 2011 Summer Universiade
Medalists at the 2013 Summer Universiade
Medalists at the 2015 Summer Universiade